Yolqun Aghaj (also Romanized as Yolqūn Āghāj; also known as Yolgūn Āghāj and Yūlqūn Āghāch) is a village in Afshar Rural District, in the Central District of Takab County, West Azerbaijan Province, Iran. At the 2006 census, its population was 899, in 192 families.

References 

Populated places in Takab County